The Roman Catholic Diocese of Qacha's Nek is a diocese located in the town of Qacha’s Nek in the Ecclesiastical province of Maseru in Lesotho.

History
 January 3, 1961: Established as Diocese of Qacha’s Nek from Diocese of Maseru

Leadership
Bishops of Qacha’s Nek 
Joseph Delphis Des Rosiers, O.M.I. (January 3, 1961 – 1981)
Evaristus Thatho Bitsoane (1981-2010)
Joseph Mopeli Sephamola, O.M.I. (June 19, 2013 -)

See also
Roman Catholicism in Lesotho

Sources
 GCatholic.org
 Catholic Hierarchy

Qacha's Nek
Christian organizations established in 1961
Roman Catholic dioceses and prelatures established in the 20th century
1961 establishments in Basutoland
Roman Catholic Ecclesiastical Province of Maseru